Studies show that children from single-parent families are at a greater risk of dropping out of high school. Some of the reasoning for these children's higher risk of academic failures includes, but is not limited to the parent involvement, inconsistent disciplining, and the single-parent is less likely to have control. Furthermore, children at lacking the mother figure are at greater risk academically than those lacking a father figure.

Socioeconomic factors such as racial groups, parents school level, resources, income and family time play a vital role in these children's academic success. This places children from a single parent households at a disadvantage. Children were more susceptible to behavior problems and lower social skills which effected academic performance.

One parent households are a common epidemic. In the US, almost half of all children will be the product of a single parent household by the time they will reach high school. Children in single parent households are more likely to behave in disobedient activity, are less efficient in science and math, and are less likely that two parent households to graduate from high school, attend college etc.,. Children in special education classes are more likely to be from that of a one parent household as well as of ethnic minority.

Spending childhood years in a single parent household places children at a larger disadvantage educationally.

References

Parental responsibility (access and custody)